The Stevens Avenue Armory is an historic former armory building in Portland, Maine, United States. Built in 1908 as a utilitarian two-story brick barn for the Portland Railroad Company's electric trolleys, it was converted into its current Art Deco style in 1940 by local architect and World War I veteran John P. Thomas. Thomas also designed other nearby buildings, including Deering High School. The armory was used by the Maine National Guard for training and recruitment purposes until 2015, when it was swapped for 29 acres of land along Route 1 in Saco that was owned by the University of New England. The building was valued at $3.1 million at the time of the swap.

References

1908 establishments in Maine
Industrial buildings completed in 1908
Buildings and structures at the University of New England (United States)
Art Deco architecture in Maine
Armories in Maine